Sameer Gehlaut (born 3 March 1974) is an Indian businessman. He is the founder and chairman of the Indiabulls Group, a diversified financial services group with businesses in housing and consumer finance through independent and listed companies in the Indian stock exchanges.

Early life and education 
Gehlaut was born in Rohtak, Haryana, on 3 March 1974 and graduated in Mechanical engineering from the Indian Institute of Technology, New Delhi in 1995.

Career 
Gehlaut founded the Indiabulls Group in 1999. The Group has businesses spread across housing and consumer finance through independent and listed companies in the Indian stock exchanges. Indiabulls Housing Finance, the Group's flagship company, is Ba2 rated by S&P.

Personal life 
Gehlaut is married to Divya S. Gehlaut and they have two children.

References 

1974 births
Living people
Indian chief executives
People named in the Panama Papers